The International Organization of Supreme Audit Institutions (INTOSAI) is an intergovernmental organization whose members are supreme audit institutions. Nearly every supreme audit institution in the world is a member of INTOSAI. Depending on the type of system used in their home country, the members of INTOSAI may be variously titled the Chief Financial Controller, the Office of the Comptroller General, the Office of the Auditor General, the Court of Accounts, or the Board of Audit.

INTOSAI holds a triennial conference entitled the International Congress of Supreme Audit Institutions (INCOSAI).
It publishes the quarterly International Journal of Government Auditing and publishes guidelines and international standards on auditing.

History
INTOSAI was founded in 1953 in Havana, Cuba. Thirty-four audit organizations formed the group originally and as of 2010 the current membership includes 193 institutions (188 national institutions, the European Court of Auditors and 4 associated members).

The members of INTOSAI are the primary external auditors of the United Nations. The UN's General Assembly appoints the UN Board of Auditors (3 members appointed for 6 years) among the INTOSAI member representatives.

The ISSAIs, International Standards of Supreme Audit Institutions
The International Standards of Supreme Audit Institutions (ISSAI) are a benchmark for auditing public entities (External Audit Standards for public entities).

The "INTOSAI Auditing Standards" had been approved by the INCOSAI in 1998 and updated in 2001. In its strategic plan 2005–2010, the INTOSAI decided to "provide an up-to-date framework of professional standards", so the INTOSAI Professional Standards Committee decided to merge the existing and new INTOSAI standards and guidelines into a framework.

The framework comprises all documents endorsed by INCOSAI with the purpose of guiding the professional standards used by SAIs

The list of ISSAIs is in the table below:
Auditing Standards (ISSAI-numbers of 3 digits) stipulate general principles and postulates for carrying out the audit work;
Implementation Guidelines (ISSAI-numbers of 4 digits) give more detailed guidance, practical assistance to SAIs in implementing the Standards in their individual constituents.

The three main types of public-sector audit

Financial Audit 
Financial audit focuses on determining whether an entity’s financial information is presented in accordance with the applicable financial reporting and regulatory framework. This is accomplished by obtaining sufficient and appropriate audit evidence to enable the auditor to express an opinion as to whether the financial information is free from material misstatement due to fraud or error.

Performance Audit 
Performance audit focuses on whether interventions, programmes and institutions are performing in accordance with the principles of economy, efficiency and effectiveness and whether there is room for improvement. Performance is examined against suitable criteria, and the causes of deviations from those criteria or other problems are analysed. The aim is to answer key audit questions and to provide recommendations for improvement.

Compliance Audit 
Compliance audit focuses on whether a particular subject matter is in compliance with authorities identified as criteria. Compliance auditing is performed by assessing whether activities, financial transactions and information are, in all material respects, in compliance with the authorities which govern the audited entity. These authorities may include rules, laws and regulations, budgetary resolutions, policy, established codes, agreed terms or the general principles governing sound public sector financial management and the conduct of public officials.

Examples of publications
Examples of its major publications are:
Guidelines for Internal Control Standards for the Public Sector (1992 - The current text is the 2004 revision by the INTOSAI Internal Control Standards Committee, approved by the XVIIIth INCOSAI of October 2004. It has been subsequently integrated in the INTOSAI standards/guidances as "INTOSAI GOV 9100"). It relies upon the COSO's integrated framework for internal control (as stated in the preface), and uses the COSO's definition of Internal Control and IIA's definition of Internal Audit.
Guidelines on Best Practice for the Audit of Privatizations, (1998)
Guidance for Planning an Audit of Internal Controls for Public Debt, (2002)

Adoption by intergovernmental organizations
In addition to the INTOSAI members (the Supreme Audit Institutions), the following intergovernmental organizations have adopted INTOSAI AS:
Council of Europe
European Communities
The European Court of Auditors performs its audits in accordance with the IFAC and INTOSAI Auditing Standards and Codes of ethics, in so far as these are applicable in the European Community context.
European Centre for Medium-Range Weather Forecasts
Audit by two appointed Supreme Audit Institutions.
European Space Agency
Audit by an Audit Board composed of Supreme Audit Institutions auditors.
EUMETSAT
Audit by an appointed Supreme Audit Institution.
International Criminal Police Organization
North Atlantic Treaty Organization
Organisation for Economic Co-operation and Development
Audit by a Supreme Audit Institution.
The United Nations
The United Nations' Board of Auditors (the external audit of the UN) has adopted the ISAs (International Standards on Auditing). The Board is composed of three Supreme Audit Institutions chairmen, familiar with and usually using the INTOSAI Auditing Standards.

INTOSAI and Internal Audit
The Institute of Internal Auditors (IIA) is among the five associated members of the INTOSAI. The INTOSAI is a strong advocate for the establishment of Independent Internal audit in public entities.

 ISSAI 1610 – Using the Work of Internal Auditors
 INTOSAI Guidance for Good governance: INTOSAI GOVs 9100–9230

The guidance "INTOSAI GOV 9100" states:

 (page 46) "The Supreme Audit Institution also has a vested interest in ensuring that strong internal audit units exist where needed. Those audit units constitute an important element of internal control by providing a continuous means for improving an organisation's operations. In some countries, however, the internal audit units may lack independence, be weak, or be non-existent. In those cases, the SAI should, whenever possible, offer assistance and guidance to establish and develop those capacities and to ensure the independence of the internal auditor's activities."
 "The creation of an internal audit unit as part of the internal control system is a strong signal by management that internal control is important. ... For an internal audit function to be effective, it is essential that the internal audit staff be independent from management, work in an unbiased, correct and honest way and that they report directly to the highest level of authority within the organisation. ... "For professional guidance, internal auditors should use the Professional Practices Framework (PPF) of the Institute of Internal Auditors (IIA) (...) Additionally, internal auditors should follow the INTOSAI Code of Ethics".

Regional working groups
AFROSAI: African Organization of Supreme Audit Institutions
ARABOSAI: Arab Organization of Supreme Audit Institutions
ASOSAI: Asian Organization of Supreme Audit Institutions
CAROSAI: Caribbean Organization of Supreme Audit Institutions
EUROSAI: European Organization of Supreme Audit Institutions. For more information please see website.
OLACEFS: Organization of Latin American and Caribbean Supreme Audit Institutions. For more information please see website
PASAI: Pacific Association of Supreme Audit Institutions

List of INTOSAI Conferences

Memberships 
The following supreme audit institution are members of INTOSAI:

Full Members

 : State Supreme Audit (Albania)
 : Cour des Comptes
 : Tribunal de Comptes
 : Tribunal de Contas de Angola
 : Auditoría General de la Nación
 : Chamber of Audit
 : Australian National Audit Office
 : Rechnungshof
 : Chamber of Accounts
 : Office of the Auditor General
 : National Audit Office
 : Comptroller and Auditor General
 : Auditor General's Office
 : State Control Committee
 : Court of Audit of Belgium
 : The Office of the Auditor General
 : Chambre des Comptes de la Cour Suprême
 : Royal Audit Authority
 : Contraloría General del Estado
 : Office of the Auditor General
 : Tribunal de Contas da União
 : Chamber of Audit
 : Tribunal de Contas
 : National Audit Authority of Cambodia
 : Auditor General of Canada
 : Inspection Général d’État
 : Comptroller General of Chile
 : National Audit Office
 : Contraloria General de la República
 : Cour Suprême – Section des Comptes des Comores
 : Contraloria General de la República
 : Cour des Comptes de Côte d'Ivoire
 : Drzavni Ured za Reviziju
 : Contraloría General de la República de Cuba
 : Audit Office of the Republic
 : Supreme Audit Office
 : Rigsrevisionen
 : Cour des Comptes
 : Audit Department
 : Cámara de Cuentas de la República Dominicana
 : Central Auditing Organization
 : Office of the Auditor General
 : Office of the Auditor General
 : National Audit Office of Finland
 : Court of Audit
 : Cour des Comptes
 : National Audit Office
 : Ghana Audit Service
 : Bundesrechnungshof
 : State Audit Office of Georgia
 : Court of Audit
 : Audit Department
 : Contraloría General de Cuentas
 : Cour des Comptes
 : Tribunal de Contas
 : The Audit Office of Guyana
 : Cour Supérieure CCA
 : Tribunal Superior de Cuentas
 : Allami Számvevöszék
 : Rikisendurskodun
 : Comptroller and Auditor General of India
 : Audit Board of Indonesia
 : Supreme Audit Court
 : Federal Board of Supreme Audit
 : Comptroller and Auditor General
 : State Comptroller's Office
 : Court of Audit
 : Audit Department
 : Board of Audit
 : Audit Bureau of Jordan
 : Accounts Committee
 : Kenya National Audit Office
 : Kiribati National Audit Office
 : National Audit Office of Kosovo
 : State Audit Bureau
 : The Accounts Chamber of the Kyrgyz Republic
 : State Audit Organization
 : Latvijas Republikas Valsts kontrole
 : Cour des Comptes
 : Office of the Auditor General
 : General Auditing Commission
 : Libyan Audit Bureau
 : Finanzkontrolle des Fürstentums Liechtenstein
 : Valstybės kontrolė
 : Cour des Comptes
 : Cour des Comptes
 : National Audit Office
 : National Audit Department
 : Auditor General's Office
 : Contrôle Général des Services Publics
 : National Audit Office
 : Office of the Auditor General
 : Cour des Comptes de la République Islamique de Mauritanie
 : National Audit Office
 : Superior Auditor of the Federation
 : Office of the Public Auditor
 : Curtea de Conturi
 : Commission Supérieure des Comptes
 : Mongolian National Audit Office
 : State Audit Institution of Montenegro
 : Cour des Comptes
 : Tribunal Administrativo
 : Office of the Auditor General
 : Office of the Auditor-General
 : Department of Audit
 : Office of the Auditor General
 : Court of Audit
 : Office of the Auditor-General
 : Consejo Superior de la Contraloría General
 : Cour des comptes
 : Office of the Auditor General for the Federation
 : Drzaven zavod za revizija
 : Office of the Auditor General of Norway
 : State Audit Institution
 : Auditor General of Pakistan
 : Office of the Public Auditor
 : State Audit and Administrative Control Bureau
 : Contraloría General de la República de Panamá
 : Auditor General's Office
 : Contraloría General de la República
 : Contraloria General de la República
 : Commission on Audit of the Philippines
 : Supreme Audit Office
 : Court of Auditors
 : State Audit Bureau
 : Cour des Comptes et de Discipline Budgétaire
 : Court of Audit
 : Accounts Chamber of Russia
 : Office of the Auditor General
 : The Audit Office
 : Office of the Director of Audit
 : Samoa Audit Office
 : Tribunal de Contas
 : General Auditing Bureau
 : Cour des Comptes
 : Drzavna revizorska institucija
 : The Audit Department
 : Audit Service Sierra Leone
 : Auditor General's Office
 : Najvyšši kontrolný úrad Slovenskej republiky
 : Court of Audit of Slovenia
 : Office of the Auditor General
 : Office of the Auditor General
 : Auditor-General of South Africa
 : Board of Audit and Inspection
 : National Audit Chamber
 : Court of Auditors
 : National Audit Office
 : Audit Office
 : National Audit Chamber
 : Rekenkamer van Suriname
 : Swedish National Audit Office
 : Eidgenössische Finanzkontrolle
 : The Central Organization of Financial Control
 : Control Yuan
 : Accounts Chamber of the Republic of Tajikistan
 : National Audit Office
 : State Audit Office of the Kingdom of Thailand
 : Tribunal de Recurso
 : La Cour des Comptes
 : Audit Department
 : Auditor General's Department
 : Cour des Comptes
 : Court of Accounts
 : Office of the Auditor General
 : Office of the Auditor General
 : Accounting Chamber
 : State Audit Institution
 : National Audit Office
 : Government Accountability Office
 : Tribunal de Cuentas de la República
 : Office of the Auditor General
 : Officium Recognitoris Generalis
 : Contraloría General de la República
 : State Audit Office of Vietnam
 : Central Organization for Control and Auditing
 : Office of the Auditor General
 : Office of the Auditor General

Supranational Organisations
 : European Court of Auditors

Associate Members
 (AISCCUF)
Court of Audit of the West African Economic and Monetary Union (UEMOA)
Organization of SAIs of Portuguese Speaking Countries (OISC/CPLP)
The Institute of Internal Auditors (IIA)
World Bank

See also 
 Government performance auditing
 CGAP: Institute of Internal Auditors#Other certificates offered by the IIA
 INTOSAI Development Initiative
 Negative assurance and Positive assurance
 UNMAI

References

External links
 A draft framework of ISSAI standards: www.afrosai-e.org.za
 INTOSAI Marks 50 Years International Journal of Government Auditing January 2003

 
Auditing organizations
1953 establishments in Cuba
Intergovernmental organizations
Standards organisations in Austria